The following is a list of Grand pensionaries of Holland, Zeeland and the Batavian Republic. During the time of the Dutch Republic, the Grand Pensionary was the most prominent member of the government. Though officially only a civil servant of the Estates, the Grand Pensionary was the de facto leader of the entire republic, second only to the stadtholder, and often served in a capacity similar to that of today's prime ministers.

Holland

In the Seventeen Provinces
Grand Pensionaries of the province of Holland during the time of the Seventeen Provinces:

In the Dutch Republic
Holland formally adopted the Act of Abjuration in 1581 to become a province in the Republic of the Seven United Netherlands. Grand Pensionaries of the province of Holland during the time of the Republic of the Seven United Netherlands:

Zeeland 
Grand Pensionaries of the province of Zeeland during the time of the Republic of the Seven United Netherlands:

Batavian Republic 
Grand Pensionaries of the Batavian Republic:

See also
 List of vice-presidents of the Council of State
 List of prime ministers of the Netherlands

 
History of Zeeland